is a Japanese actor. His name was given by Yasujirō Ozu. His father, Keiji Sada, also a movie actor, died when Nakai was only two years old.  Nakai started his acting career while he was still in university and was awarded the Rookie of the Year at the Japan Academy Awards in 1981.

He won the Japan Academy Best Supporting Actor award in 1994 (for 47 Ronin) and Best Actor award in 2003 (for Mibu gishi den (When the Last Sword is Drawn)). He also won the award for best supporting actor at the 19th Hochi Film Award for 47 Ronin.

In 2003 he played a Japanese delegate to a Chinese emperor of the Tang dynasty in Warriors of Heaven and Earth. Though a few of his  lines are in Japanese, most are in Mandarin.

His older sister, Kie Nakai, is also an actress.

Selected filmography

Film

Television

Video games

Japanese dubbing

Honours
Medal with Purple Ribbon (2020)

References

External links
 Official profile 

1961 births
Living people
Japanese male film actors
Japanese male television actors
Japanese male voice actors
Taiga drama lead actors
Male actors from Tokyo
20th-century Japanese male actors
21st-century Japanese male actors
Recipients of the Medal with Purple Ribbon